Christina Aguilera with the LA Phil was a two show concert engagement by American singer Christina Aguilera, accompanied by the Los Angeles Philharmonic orchestra and Venezuelan conductor Gustavo Dudamel. It was held at the Hollywood Bowl in Los Angeles, California on July 16 and 17, 2021. The shows were part of the Los Angeles Philharmonic Association's summer season at the Hollywood Bowl for 2021 and were Aguilera's first live performance in almost 18 months, following the cancellation of her Las Vegas residency, Christina Aguilera: The Xperience in September 2020 due to the COVID-19 pandemic. It was announced on May 11, 2021, with tickets going on sale on June 1.

During the show, Aguilera performed her discography as well as several covers, with the LA Phil contributing to all but five numbers, as well as several interludes. Aside from the orchestra, Aguilera was also joined by her tour band.

Background 

Following the conclusion of The X Tour in 2019, Aguilera continued her Las Vegas residency, Christina Aguilera: The Xperience. The residency was planned to continue until November 2020, but following the show on March 7, it was cancelled due to the COVID-19 pandemic with the final leg getting cancelled in September. Aguilera wouldn't perform for almost 18 months following the cancellation of Christina Aguilera: The Xperience. Aguilera was invited to perform at the Hollywood Bowl for a two night residency by Dudamel on behalf of the LA Philharmonic. The shows were announced on May 11, 2021, with tickets going on sale on June 1. Due to COVID restrictions, audience members were required to wear masks for the duration of the show. The shows were part of the Los Angeles Philharmonic's summer season.

About the show

Music 
The set featured the contribution of Gustavo Dudamel, conducting the orchestra of the Los Angeles Philharmonic, as well as Aguilera's own band. The set list featured songs from four of Aguilera's English-language albums (excluding 2000's My Kind of Christmas, 2010's Bionic, and 2012's Lotus), as well as her rendition of "Contigo en la Distancia", which is featured on her first Spanish-language album, Mi Reflejo (2000). In addition to songs from her own discography, Aguilera also performed two covers: Etta James' "At Last", and James Brown's "It's a Man's Man's Man's World", both songs she'd previously covered and received acclaim for.

Fashion and style 
The show's fashion was characterized by several costume changes, which were done over a base outfit, which Aguilera wore the entire show. Aguilera's makeup was done by Etienne Ortega and her hair by Iggy Rosales, while the styling was handled by editor-in-chief of Interview, Mel Ottenberg. Ottenberg wrote an article for Interview documenting the design and styling process.

Set design 
Set design for the show was handled by Kristen Vallow. The show's setting was mostly similar in nature to the regular stage, with the addition of a large white mountain-shaped setpiece. The mountain served as a projection screen, used to project visual effects onto it. Aguilera could also climb to the top through a staircase in the back, as she did during her performances of "At Last" and "It's a Man's Man's Man's World". The mountain was a reference to the 1965 film The Sound of Music. During the show, Aguilera addressed the mountain, saying:I was originally, of course, inspired by the great Rodgers and Hammerstein and The Sound of Music being the first thing that ever spoke to me musically. I wanted to be Julie Andrews on the hills and tonight is that moment for me. I’m just constantly inspired by composers and the way they create worlds and take you to other places and have new perspectives hearing things, it’s just incredible.

Critical reception 

Ranita Aniftos of Billboard complimented Aguilera's "mind blowing vocal runs" and called her rendition of "At Last" an "intoxicating cover of Etta James' classic". Variety's Chris William complimented the 70-minute set's fashion and ability to incorporate the orchestra into songs like "Dirrty".

Set list 

 "At Last" 
"Ain't No Other Man"
 "Genie in a Bottle"
 "The Voice Within"
 "Boys Wanna Be Her"  / "Can't Hold Us Down" 
 "Maria"
 "Twice" 
 "Say Something"
 "Dirrty"
 "Express / "Lady Marmalade" 
 "Contigo en la Distancia"
 "What a Girl Wants"
 "It's a Man's Man's Man's World"
 "Fighter"
Encore
"Beautiful"

See also 
 List of Christina Aguilera concerts

References 

2021 concert residencies
Christina Aguilera concert residencies
Hollywood Bowl